Toros I, also Thoros I, (unknown – 1129 / February 17, 1129 – February 16, 1130) was the third lord of Armenian Cilicia or “Lord of the Mountains” (c. 1100 / 1102 / 1103 – 1129 / 1130).

His alliance with the leaders of the First Crusade helped him rule his feudal holdings with commanding authority. Toros ejected the Byzantine garrisons from the fortifications at Anazarbus and Sis, making the latter his capital. He was plagued by the nomadic Turks who were harassing him from the north but were driven back.

He avenged the death of King Gagik II by killing his assassins. This act of revenge was often used by chroniclers of the 12th century as direct evidence connecting the Roupenians to the Bagratid lineage.

During his time he bestowed favors and gave gifts and money to many monasteries for their decoration and adornment, in particular those of Drazark (Trassarg) and Mashgevar.

His life 
Toros was the elder son of Constantine I, lord of Armenian Cilicia. It is likely that his mother was the great-granddaughter of Bardas Phokas.

Toros succeeded his father and ruled from the fortresses of Vahka (today Feke in Turkey) and Pardzepert (today Andırın in Turkey). In 1107, encouraged by Tancred, Prince of Antioch, Toros followed the course of the Pyramus River (today the river Ceyhan in Turkey), and seized the strongholds of Anazarbus (a place which had been considered impregnable) and Sis (ancient city). Toros extensively rebuilt the fortifications at both fortresses with tall circuit walls and massive round towers. In the south bailey of the castle at Anazarbus he commemorated his victories by constructing a three-aisle, barrel-vaulted basilica, which he consecrated to St Zoravark and where he reportedly housed the ancestral treasures of King Gagik II. A beautifully executed dedicatory inscription on the church (dated ca. A.D.1111) records his triumph, and most importantly, traces his Rubenid genealogy.

In 1108, Daphar, the leader of the nomadic Turks, invaded the province of Hasamansur and ravaged the lands around Melitene (today Malataya in Turkey). Toros called for the help of Basilius the Crafty, an Armenian noble who governed possessions in the vicinity of Marash (today Kahramanmaraş in Turkey) and Kesoun. Basilius and his allies attacked Daphar and achieved a resounding victory near the castle of Harthan. Basilius nobly shared with Toros the spoils which were taken from the Turks.

In 1111, Sultan Malik Shah of Konya entered Armenian territories, and Toros’s two commanders were killed in battle. However, his brother, Levon launched a savage attack against the Turks and drove them into retreat, thereby saving the Armenian Kingdom of Cilicia into falling in the hands of the Turks.

Toros, who had relentlessly pursued the murderers of King Gagik II, laid an ambush for them at their castle, Cyzistra (Kizistra) in 1112. At an opportune time, his infantry surprised the garrison and occupied the castle, plundered it then took blood revenge by killing all its inhabitants. The three brothers (the assassins of Gagik II) were taken captive and forced to produce Gagik’s kingly sword and his royal apparel taken at the time of the murder. One of the brothers was beaten to death by Toros who justified his brutal action by exclaiming that such monsters did not deserve to perish by the quick plunge of a dagger.

In 1114, Vasil Dgha (the heir of Basilius the Crafty) invited Il-Bursuqi (the governor of Mosul) to deliver the Armenians from the Franks (the Crusaders). The Franks advanced to punish Vasil Dgha, but they were unable to take his fortress capital at Raban. Nevertheless, he thought it wise to seek alliance with Toros. Toros, after inviting him to come to discuss a marriage alliance, imprisoned him and sold him to Count Baldwin II of Edessa in 1116. Having thus annexed Raban, Baldwin II of Edessa decided to suppress the remaining Armenian principalities in the Euphrates valley; thus Toros soon found himself the only independent Armenian potentate that remained.

In 1118, Toros sent a contingent of troops under the command of his brother Levon to help Prince Roger of Antioch in the capture of Azaz (today A'zāz in Syria).

Toros was buried in the monastery of Drazark.

Marriage and children 
The name of Toros’s wife is not known.
Constantine II of Cilicia (? – after February 17, 1129)
(?) Oshin (? – after February 17, 1129)

Footnotes

Sources 
Edwards, Robert W.: The Fortifications of Armenian Cilicia: Dumbarton Oaks Studies XXIII; Dumbarton Oaks, Trustees for Harvard University, 1987, Washington, D.C.; 
Edwards, Robert W.: “Ecclesiastical Architecture in the Fortifications of Armenian Cilicia: First Report,” Dumbarton Oaks Papers vol. 36; Dumbarton Oaks, Trustees for Harvard University, 1982, Washington, D.C.;  
Edwards, Robert W.: “Ecclesiastical Architecture in the Fortifications of Armenian Cilicia: Second Report,” Dumbarton Oaks Papers vol. 37; Dumbarton Oaks, Trustees for Harvard University, 1983, Washington, D.C.;

External links
 Armenian History page on Cilicia
 Armenian History page on Thorus I
 
 Armenian History page on Cilician history
 The Barony of Cilician Armenia (Kurkjian's History of Armenia, Ch. 27)
 Smbat Sparapet's Chronicle

1129 deaths
Year of birth unknown
12th-century Armenian people
Monarchs of the Rubenid dynasty